Hairshirt (released to home video as Too Smooth) is a 1998 romantic comedy film starring Dean Paras, Neve Campbell, Katie Wright, Rebecca Gayheart and Stefan Brogren.

Plot
Danny Reilly (Dean Paras) is a self-obsessed man who, after dumping Renee Weber (Neve Campbell), falls in love again with Corey Wells (Katie Wright). But Renee makes it her mission to see that Danny never falls in love again and sets out for attack when he falls for Corey. Who will get the girl when Danny's constantly talking roomie Tim (Stefan Brogren) falls in love with Corey too?

Cast
 Dean Paras as Danny Reilly
 Neve Campbell as Renee Weber
 Katie Wright as Corrinne "Corey" Wells
 Rebecca Gayheart as Jennifer Scott
 Stefan Brogren as Timothy "Tim" Wright
 David DeLuise as Peter Angelo
 Adam Carolla as Bruce Greenberg
 Christian Campbell as Adam Lipton
 Dax Sheppard as Party Vomiter
 Adam Scott as Bar Fan
 Marley Shelton as Hot Blonde
 Ele Keats as Slapping Girl
 Alfonso Cuaron as Director

External links
 
 

1998 films
1998 romantic comedy films
Lionsgate films
American romantic comedy films
Films scored by Nathan Barr
1990s English-language films
1990s American films
English-language romantic comedy films